Patricia Larqué Juste (born 2 May 1992) is a Spanish footballer who plays as a goalkeeper for Alavés currently playing in Liga F.

Club career
Larqué started her career at Zaragoza CFF.

References

External links
Profile at La Liga

1992 births
Living people
Women's association football goalkeepers
Spanish women's footballers
Footballers from Zaragoza
Zaragoza CFF players
Santa Teresa CD players
Rayo Vallecano Femenino players
Primera División (women) players